Murgisca cervinalis is a species of snout moth in the genus Murgisca. It was described by Francis Walker in 1863, and is known from the Dominican Republic.

References

External links
 

Moths described in 1863
Chrysauginae